Jonah Nathan Heim (born June 27, 1995), nicknamed "The Buffalo Bomber,"is an American professional baseball catcher for the Texas Rangers of Major League Baseball (MLB). He made his MLB debut in 2020 for the Oakland Athletics.

Early life
Heim attended Kenmore East High School in Tonawanda, New York, and Amherst Central High School in Snyder, New York. In 2013, he signed a letter of intent to attend Michigan State University on a college baseball scholarship to play for the Michigan State Spartans.

Career

Baltimore Orioles
The Baltimore Orioles selected Heim in the fourth round, with the 129th overall selection, of the 2013 MLB draft. He signed with Baltimore, receiving a  $389,700 signing bonus, rather than enroll at Michigan State. He made his professional debut that season the GCL Orioles and spent all of 2013 there, slashing .185/.275/.247 in 27 games. In 2014, he played for the GCL Orioles and the Aberdeen IronBirds where he batted .196 with one home run and seven RBIs in 46 games, and in 2015, he played for the Delmarva Shorebirds where he compiled a .248 batting average with one home runs and 16 RBIs in 43 games. He began 2016 with the Frederick Keys.

Tampa Bay Rays
On August 1, 2016, the Orioles traded Heim to the Tampa Bay Rays in exchange for Steve Pearce. Tampa Bay assigned him to the Charlotte Stone Crabs and he finished the season there. In 102 total games between Frederick and Charlotte, he collected a .217 batting average with eight home runs and 33 RBIs. He spent 2017 with both Charlotte and the Bowling Green Hot Rods, slashing .260/.317/.402 with nine home runs, 61 RBIs, and a .718 OPS in 93 games.

Oakland Athletics
Heim was traded to the Oakland Athletics on December 19, 2017, as the player to be named later to complete a trade for Joey Wendle. He spent 2018 with both the Stockton Ports and the Midland RockHounds, batting .258 with eight home runs and sixty RBIs in 119 total games between both teams. He split the 2019 season between Midland and the Las Vegas Aviators, hitting a combined .310/.385/.477/.862 with 9 home runs and 53 RBI. On November 1, 2019, Heim was added to the Athletics 40–man roster.

On August 24, 2020, Heim was promoted to the major leagues for the first time. Heim made his major league debut the next day against the Texas Rangers as the starting catcher. Heim hit .211 with 5 RBI over 13 games for Oakland in 2020.

Texas Rangers
On February 6, 2021, Heim, Khris Davis, and Dane Acker were traded to the Texas Rangers in exchange for Elvis Andrus and Aramis Garcia.

Heim hit his first major league home run on April 6, 2021, off Toronto Blue Jays pitcher Tommy Milone. On July 31, Heim hit home runs from each side of the plate, including his first career walk-off home run, off Seattle Mariners pitcher Diego Castillo. On August 1, he hit another walk-off home run versus Seattle to become the first player in Texas Rangers history, and the first rookie in MLB history, to record walk-off home runs in two straight games. Uniquely, in July of 2021, the Rangers played the Toronto Blue Jays in Heim's hometown of Buffalo, New York due to the Blue Jays' temporary relocation to Sahlen Field as a result of not being able to play at the Rogers Centre during the pandemic, resulting in Heim getting the opportunity to play a major-league series in front of a hometown crowd. Heim went 2-for-7 in the two games he played, while the Rangers were swept by the Blue Jays. Over 82 games in 2021, Heim hit .196/.239/.358/.598 with 10 home runs and 32 RBI.

Heim hit his first major league grand slam on April 14, 2022, off Los Angeles Angels pitcher Shohei Ohtani in a 10-5 Rangers win; it was the first and to date only grand slam Ohtani has given up in his major league career. Heim appeared in 127 games for Texas in 2022, in which he hit .227/.298/.399/.697 with 16 home runs and 48 RBI.

Personal life
Heim and his wife, Kenzie, have a son and a daughter together.

References

External links

1995 births
Living people
People from Buffalo, New York
Baseball players from New York (state)
Major League Baseball catchers
Oakland Athletics players
Texas Rangers players
Gulf Coast Orioles players
Aberdeen IronBirds players
Delmarva Shorebirds players
Frederick Keys players
Charlotte Stone Crabs players
Bowling Green Hot Rods players
Stockton Ports players
Midland RockHounds players
Las Vegas Aviators players
Toros del Este players
American expatriate baseball players in the Dominican Republic
Amherst Central High School Alumni